Ocellularia roseotecta is a species of corticolous (bark-dwelling) lichen in the family Graphidaceae. Found in Malaysia, it was formally described as a new species in 2002 by lichenologists Natsurang Homchantara and Brian J. Coppins. It is only known to occur at the type locality. The lichen has a whitish-brown, irregularly cracked thallus and a medulla that is coloured from white to pale pink. The specific epithet roseotecta refers to the pink pigment of the medulla.

See also
 List of Ocellularia species

References

roseotecta
Lichen species
Lichens described in 2002
Lichens of Malaysia
Taxa named by Brian John Coppins
Taxa named by Natsurang Homchantara